Mount Poland is a  mountain summit located in the Canadian Rockies of British Columbia, Canada. The mountain was named after Canadian Army Private Herbert J. Poland of Golden, BC, who was killed in 1944 World War II action. The mountain's name was officially adopted July 5, 1961, when approved by the Geographical Names Board of Canada. The first ascent of the mountain was made in 1958 by J. Owen, E. Pigou, and guide A. Bitterlich. 


Climate
Based on the Köppen climate classification, Mount Poland is located in a subarctic climate with cold, snowy winters, and mild summers. Temperatures can drop below −20 °C with wind chill factors below −30 °C. Precipitation runoff from the mountain drains into Blaeberry River and Waitabit Creek, which are both tributaries of the Columbia River.

See also
 
 
 Geology of the Rocky Mountains
 List of mountains in the Canadian Rockies

References

External links
 Weather: Mount Poland

Two-thousanders of British Columbia
Canadian Rockies
Columbia Country
Kootenay Land District